The Niagara Stars played in the independent Canadian Baseball League that existed for half of the summer season of 2003 before folding. Located in the city of Welland, Ontario the team featured a variety of international ballplayers from Canada, the Dominican Republic, and the United States. The Stars were managed by former major leaguer Pete LaCock who led the team to a 15-15 record before league officials pulled the plug on the season at the half-way point. Dave MacLean worked as a member of the front office staff, supplying the team with its only working desktop computer.

Roster

Pitchers

Batters

References

Defunct minor league baseball teams
Defunct baseball teams in Canada
Baseball teams in Ontario
Sport in Welland
2003 establishments in Ontario
2003 disestablishments in Ontario
Baseball teams established in 2003
Baseball teams disestablished in 2003
Defunct independent baseball league teams